Snowflake Inc. is a cloud computing–based data cloud company based in Bozeman, Montana. It was founded in July 2012 and was publicly launched in October 2014 after two years in stealth mode.

The firm offers a cloud-based data storage and analytics service, generally termed "data-as-a-service". It allows corporate users to store and analyze data using cloud-based hardware and software. Snowflake services main features are separation of storage and compute, on-the-fly scalable compute, data sharing, data cloning, and third-party tools support in order to handle the demanding needs of growing enterprises. It runs on Amazon S3 since 2014, on Microsoft Azure since 2018 and on the Google Cloud Platform since 2019. The company was ranked first on the Forbes Cloud 100 in 2019. The company's initial public offering raised $3.4 billion in September 2020, one of the largest software IPOs in history.

History
Snowflake Inc. was founded in July 2012 in San Mateo, California by three data warehousing experts: Benoît Dageville, Thierry Cruanes and Marcin Żukowski. Dageville and Cruanes previously worked as data architects at Oracle Corporation; Żukowski was a co-founder of the Dutch start-up Vectorwise. The company's first CEO was Mike Speiser, a venture capitalist at Sutter Hill Ventures.

In June 2014, the company appointed former Microsoft executive Bob Muglia as CEO. In October 2014, it raised $26 million and came out of stealth mode, being used by 80 organizations.  In June 2015, the company raised an additional $45 million and launched its first product, its cloud data warehouse, to the public. It raised another  $100 million in April 2017. In January 2018, the company announced a $263 million financing round at a $1.5 billion valuation, making it a unicorn. In October 2018, it raised another $450 million in a round led by Sequoia Capital, raising its valuation to $3.5 billion.

In May 2019, Frank Slootman, the retired former CEO of ServiceNow, joined Snowflake as its CEO and Michael Scarpelli, the former CFO of ServiceNow joined the company as CFO. In June 2019, the company launched Snowflake Data Exchange. In September 2019, it was ranked first on LinkedIn's 2019 U.S. list of Top Startups.

On February 7, 2020, the company raised another $479 million. At that time, it had 3,400 active customers. On September 16, 2020, Snowflake became a public company via an initial public offering (IPO) raising $3.4 billion, one of the largest software IPOs and the largest to double on its first day of trading.

On May 26, 2021, the company announced that it would become headquarterless, with a principal executive office located in Bozeman, Montana.

On October 17, 2022, the company announced an investment in advanced TV advertising firm OpenAP.

References

External links
 
 

Data warehousing products
Cloud databases
Cloud computing providers
Big data products
Big data companies
Information technology companies of the United States
Computer companies established in 2012
American companies established in 2012
2012 establishments in California
2020 initial public offerings
Companies listed on the New York Stock Exchange